Michael S. Okun (born July 5, 1971) is an American neurologist, neuroscientist and author. He is the co-founder and director of the Norman Fixel Institute for Neurological Diseases at University of Florida Health and is also the chair of the Department of Neurology at the University of Florida and the Medical Director/Advisor for the Parkinson's Foundation.

Career 
Okun co-founded the movement disorders program at the University of Florida in 2002 with neurosurgeon Kelly D. Foote. Okun opened his laboratory located at the McKnight Brain Institute on the University Campus. The goals of his laboratory were to uncover the underpinnings of human tic in Tourette syndrome, explore non-motor basal ganglia circuitry and to innovate neuromodulation and circuit-based treatments for human disease.

Okun recognized that some diseases lacked animal models which would recapitulate the human condition(s). He advocated and implemented a neuroethics-based approach to utilize the operating room and the outpatient clinic setting for research into these neurological conditions. The Okun laboratory originally focused on Tourette syndrome because of the paroxysmal nature of human tic, which made it ideal to explore the physiological underpinnings of the movement disorder. His work has been important in understanding the biological changes underpinning the neural network changes which underpin the symptomatic benefits of deep brain stimulation and for moving toward symptom and circuit based treatments rather than disease based treatments. Okun has trained over 70 clinical MD fellows and many researchers in basal ganglia and related disorders.

Okun and the University of Florida based group performed a series of National Institutes of Health, foundation and philanthropically funded experiments between 2002 and 2022 that resulted in the successful characterization of human tic physiology.

Awards 
Okun has been recognized as the top clinical-researcher at the University of Florida College of Medicine (2021) and he was also recognized in a 2015 White House ceremony by the Obama administration as a Champion of Change for Parkinson's Disease.

Writings
Okun's first book as an author was Lessons from the Bedside which this was published in 1995 as a book of prose and poetry which chronicled the medical school experience. He was interviewed for the PBS series Healing Words (2008) which focused on poetry in medicine.

Okun has been published in the New England Journal of Medicine, Lancet, and the Journal of the American Medical Association. He has authored or co-authored 14 books and hundreds of research articles.

Selected publications
Okun, Michael S. (2013). Parkinson's treatment : the 10 secrets to a happier life (English ed.). [United States]: [CreateSpace]. ISBN 978-1-4818-5499-3. OCLC 842155662 was translated into over 20 languages and it was the first to propose the idea of a coming “Parkinson’s pandemic.” 
Dorsey, Ray (2020). Ending Parkinson's disease : a prescription for action. Todd Sherer, Michael S. Okun, Bastiaan R. Bloem (First ed.). New York. ISBN 978-1-5417-2452-5. OCLC 1108524282. which was co-authored by Ray Dorsey, Todd Scherer and Bastiaan Bloem, Okun introduced the idea of a PACT to end Parkinson's disease (Prevent, Advocate, Care, develop Treatments).

References 

Living people
1971 births
American neurologists
University of Florida faculty